Rinat Ibragimov (born 7 May 1986 in Guryev, Kazakh SSR) is a Kazakhstani judoka (practitioner of the Japanese martial art of judo). He competed in the men's 73 kg event at the 2008 and 2012 Summer Olympics.  At the 2008 Olympics, he lost his first match to Wang Ki-chun.  Because Wang went on to the final, Ibragimov competed in the repechage, where he lost to Shokir Muminov.

At the 2012 Summer Olympics he was eliminated by Wang Ki-Chun in the second round.

References

External links
 
 

1986 births
Living people
Kazakhstani male judoka
Olympic judoka of Kazakhstan
Judoka at the 2008 Summer Olympics
Judoka at the 2012 Summer Olympics
Judoka at the 2010 Asian Games
People from Atyrau
Asian Games competitors for Kazakhstan
20th-century Kazakhstani people
21st-century Kazakhstani people